Helga Hoffmann (born 24 September 1937) is a German track and field athlete. She competed in the women's long jump at the 1956, 1960 and the 1964 Summer Olympics.

References

1937 births
Living people
Place of birth missing (living people)
German female long jumpers
German pentathletes
German female sprinters
Olympic female long jumpers
Olympic female pentathletes
Olympic athletes of the United Team of Germany
Athletes (track and field) at the 1956 Summer Olympics
Athletes (track and field) at the 1960 Summer Olympics
Athletes (track and field) at the 1964 Summer Olympics
Japan Championships in Athletics winners
20th-century German women